Albert VI of Bavaria (26 February 1584 – 5 July 1666) son of William V, Duke of Bavaria and Renata of Lorraine, born and died in Munich.

Biography 
Albert was 1651–1654 the regent for his young nephew Elector Ferdinand Maria. Through his wife Mechthilde, Albrecht came into possession of the landgraviate of Leuchtenberg, which he exchanged in 1650 for the Reichsgrafschaft (county) Haag. After the death of his son Maximilian Heinrich, Haag reverted to Bavaria. Albert's successor in Leuchtenberg was Maximilian Philipp Hieronymus of Bavaria, the second son of Elector Maximilian I. After his death also Leuchtenberg was united with Bavaria.

Issue 
In 1612 married Princess Mechthilde of Leuchtenberg (24 October 1588 – 1 June 1634), place of burial: Wallfahrtkirche Altötting. They had 5 children:

 Maria Renata, Duchess of Bayern-Leuchtenberg (3 August 1616 – 1 March 1630)
 Karl Johann Franz, Duke of Bayern-Leuchtenberg (10 November 1618 – 19 May 1640)
 Ferdinand Wilhelm, Duke of Bayern-Leuchtenberg (25 August 1620 – 23 October 1629)
 Maximilian Heinrich, Archbishop and Elector of Cologne (8 October 1621 – 3 June 1688)
 Sigmund Albrecht, Bishop of Freising and Regensburg 1668 (5 August 1623 – 4 November 1685)

Ancestors

External links 
 Genealogy

1584 births
1666 deaths
Albert VI of Bavaria
Albert VI of
Regents of Bavaria